The Cook County, Illinois, general election was held on November 7, 2006.

Primaries were held March 21, 2006.

Elections were held for Assessor, Clerk, Sheriff, Treasurer, President of the Cook County Board of Commissioners, all 17 seats of the Cook County Board of Commissioners, Cook County Board of Review districts 1 and 2, three seats on the Water Reclamation District Board, judgeships in the Circuit Court of Cook County.

Election information
2006 was a midterm election year in the United States. The primaries and general elections for Cook County races coincided with those for congressional and those for state elections.

Voter turnout

Primary election
Voter turnout in Cook County during the primaries was 28.44%, with 762,273 ballots cast. The city of Chicago saw 32.05% turnout and suburban Cook County saw 26.70% turnout.

General election
The general election saw 49.85% turnout, with 1,350,918 ballots cast. The city of Chicago saw 49.25% turnout and suburban Cook County saw 50.45% turnout.

Assessor 

In the 2006 Cook County Assessor election, incumbent Assessor James Houlihan, a Democrat first appointed in 1997 who was reelected in 1998 and 2002, was again reelected.

Primaries

Democratic

Republican

General election

Clerk 

In the 2006 Cook County Clerk election, incumbent fourth-term Clerk David Orr, a Democrat, was reelected.

Primaries

Democratic

Republican

General election

Sheriff 

In the 2006 Cook County Sheriff election, incumbent fourth-term Sheriff Michael F. Sheahan, a Democrat, did not seek reelection. Democrat Tom Dart was elected to succeed him.

Primaries

Democratic

Republican

General election

Treasurer 

In the 2006 Cook County Treasurer election, incumbent second-term Treasurer Maria Pappas, a Democrat, was reelected.

Primaries

Democratic

Republican

General election

President of the Cook County Board of Commissioners 

In the 2006 President of the Cook County Board of Commissioners election, incumbent President Todd Stroger, a Democrat appointed following the resignation of his father John Stroger, was elected to a full term. Originally, then-incumbent John Stroger had been running for reelection, winning the Democratic primary, before backing-out and also resigning from the presidency.

Primaries

Democratic

Republican

General election
Suffering health ailments, John Stroger was removed from the ticket in June and replaced by his son Todd Stroger. John Stroger retired in August, and Bobbie L. Steele was appointed to fill out the remainder of his term.

Cook County Board of Commissioners 

The 2006 Cook County Board of Commissioners election saw all seventeen seats of the Cook County Board of Commissioners up for election to four-year terms.

Fifteen members were reelected. One incumbent Democrat withdrew from their election after being renominated, while one incumbent Republican lost his primary. No seat changed parties.

1st district

Incumbent second-term Commissioner Earlean Collins, a Democrat, was reelected.

Primaries

Democratic

Republican
No candidates, ballot-certified or formal write-in, ran in the Republican primary. The Republican Party ultimately nominated Henrietta S. Butler.

General election

2nd district

Incumbent commissioner Robert Steele, a Democrat, was reelected. He had been appointed to succeed his mother Bobbie L. Steele, after they were appointed President of the Cook County Board of Commissioners.

Primaries

Democratic

Republican
No candidates, ballot-certified or formal write-in, ran in the Republican primary. The Republican Party ultimately nominated Scott W. Kummer.

General election

3rd district

Incumbent Commissioner Jerry Butler, a Democrat who first assumed the office in 1985, was reelected.

Primaries

Democratic

Republican
No candidates, ballot-certified or formal write-in, ran in the Republican primary. The Republican Party ultimately nominated Maurice Perkins.

General election

4th district

Then-incumbent Commissioner John Stroger originally sought reelection, winning the Democratic primary, but backed-out due to health issues (and also resigned his seat), and was replaced as Democratic nominee by William Beavers, who went to win the general election.

Primaries

Democratic

Republican
No candidates, ballot-certified or formal write-in, ran in the Republican primary. Ultimately, the Republican Party nominated Ann Rochelle Hunter.

General election

5th district

Incumbent third-term Commissioner Deborah Sims, a Democrat, was reelected.

Primaries

Democratic

Republican
No candidates, ballot-certified or formal write-in, ran in the Republican primary.

General election

6th district

Incumbent first-term Commissioner Joan Patricia Murphy, a Democrat, was reelected.

Primaries

Democratic

Republican

General election

7th district

Incumbent third-term Commissioner Joseph Mario Moreno, a Democrat, was reelected.

Primaries

Democratic

Republican
No candidates, ballot-certified or formal write-in, ran in the Republican primary.

General election

8th district

Incumbent third-term Commissioner Roberto Maldonado, a Democrat, was reelected.

Primaries

Democratic

Republican
No candidates, ballot-certified or formal write-in, ran in the Republican primary.

General election

9th district

Incumbent third-term Commissioner Peter N. Silvestri, a Republican, was reelected.

Primaries

Democratic

Republican

General election

10th district

Incumbent second-term Commissioner Mike Quigley, a Democrat, was reelected, running unopposed in both the Democratic primary and general election.

Primaries

Democratic

Republican
No candidates, ballot-certified or formal write-in, ran in the Republican primary.

General election

11th district

Incumbent Commissioner John P. Daley, a Democrat in office since 1992, was reelected.

Primaries

Democratic

Republican

General election

12th district

Incumbent first-term Commissioner Forrest Claypool, a Democrat, was reelected.

Primaries

Democratic

Republican
No candidates, ballot-certified or formal write-in, ran in the Republican primary.

General election

13th district

Incumbent first-term Commissioner Larry Suffredin, a Democrat, was reelected, running unopposed in both the Democratic primary and general election.

Primaries

Democratic

Republican
No candidates, ballot-certified or formal write-in, ran in the Republican primary.

General election

14th district

Incumbent second-term Commissioner Gregg Goslin, a Republican, was reelected.

Primaries

Democratic
No candidates, ballot-certified or formal write-in, ran in the Democratic primary. The Democratic Party ultimately nominated Michelene "Mickie" Polk.

Republican

General election

15th district

Incumbent eighth-term Commissioner Carl Hansen, a Republican, sought reelection, but was defeated in the Republican primary by Tim Schneider, who went on to win the general election.

Primaries

Democratic

Republican

General election

16th district

Incumbent first-term Commissioner Tony Peraica, a Republican, was reelected.

Primaries

Democratic

Republican

General election

17th district

Incumbent first-term Commissioner Elizabeth Ann Doody Gorman, a Republican, was reelected.

Primaries

Democratic

Republican

General election

Cook County Board of Review

In the 2006 Cook County Board of Review election, two seats, one Democratic-held and one Republican-held, out of its three seats were up for election.

The Cook County Board of Review has its three seats rotate the length of terms. In a staggered fashion (in which no two seats have coinciding two-year terms), the seats rotate between two consecutive four-year terms and a two-year term.

1st district

Incumbent second-term member Maureen Murphy, a Republican last reelected in 2002, lost reelection to Democrat Brendan F. Houlihan. This election was to a four-year term.

Primaries

Democratic
No candidates, ballot-certified or formal write-in, ran in the Democratic primary. Incumbent Republican Maureen Murphy successfully challenged the nomination petitions of the only Democrat running, Brendan Houlihan, meaning that he was removed from the Democratic primary ballot. However, since, consequentially no candidate appeared on the ballot in the Democratic primary, state law enabled the Democratic committeemen from the Board of Review's 1st district to pick a nominee. They ultimately selected Houlihan as their nominee.

Republican

General election

2nd district

Incumbent second-term member Joseph Berrios, a Democrat last reelected in 2002, was reelected. Berrios had not only served since the Board of Review was constituted in 1998, but had also served on its predecessor organization, the Cook County Board of (Tax) Appeals, for ten years. This election was to a two-year term.

Primaries

Democratic

Republican
No candidates, ballot-certified or formal write-in, ran in the Republican primary.

General election

Water Reclamation District Board 

In the 2006 Metropolitan Water Reclamation District of Greater Chicago  election, three of the nine seats on the Metropolitan Water Reclamation District of Greater Chicago board were up for election in an at-large race. Since three six-year seats were up for election, voters could vote for up to three candidates and the top-three finishers would win.

Incumbent commissioner, Democrat Terrence J. O'Brien, was reelected. Winners also included newly-elected Democrats Debra Shore and Patricia Horton. The two incumbents who did not seek reelection were James Harris and Harry Yourell.

Primaries

Democratic

Republican
No candidates, ballot-certified or formal write-in, ran in the Republican primary.

General election

Judicial elections
Partisan elections were held for 27 judgeships on the Circuit Court of Cook County, due to vacancies. Other judgeships had retention elections.

Partisan elections were also held for 15 subcircuit courts judgeships due to vacancies. Other judgeships had retention elections.

Other elections
Coinciding with the primaries, elections were held to elect both the Democratic and Republican committeemen for the suburban townships.

See also 
 2006 Illinois elections

References 

Cook County
Cook County, Illinois elections
Cook County 2006
Cook County